Seyda Shabana Parveen Nipa (born 1969) is a Bangladeshi chess player who holds the Woman FIDE Master (WFM) title.

She has won the Women's title in the Bangladeshi Chess Championship five times: 1989, 1995, 1997, 2002, and 2003. This is the second highest number of titles behind Rani Hamid's 19 championships.

See also 
 Bangladesh Chess Federation

References

External links 
 

1969 births
Living people
Bangladeshi female chess players
Chess Woman FIDE Masters